Electromagnetic therapy or electromagnetic field therapy refers to therapy involving the use of magnets or electromagnets.

Types include :
Bioelectromagnetics, the study of how electromagnetic fields interact with and influence biological processes.
Electrotherapy, the use of electrical or electromagnetic energy in medicine;
Electromagnetic therapy (alternative medicine), the use of electromagnetic radiation to treat disease. Evidence of efficacy is lacking.
Pulsed electromagnetic field therapy, or PEMF, the use of weak electromagnetic fields to initiate osteogenesis.
Alternating electric field therapy, also known as "Tumor Treating Fields", the use of electric fields as an anti-mitotic therapy for cancer patients.

See also
Magnet therapy, use of static magnetic fields with the aim of treating disease. Evidence of efficacy is lacking.

References

Medical procedures
Electromagnetism